Fidèle Mohinga (born 15 May 1964) is a Central African Republic boxer. He competed in the men's welterweight event at the 1988 Summer Olympics.

References

External links
 

1964 births
Living people
Central African Republic male boxers
Olympic boxers of the Central African Republic
Boxers at the 1988 Summer Olympics
Place of birth missing (living people)
Welterweight boxers